Dan Anghelescu (born 24 October 1958) is a retired Romanian football player and currently coach. He lastly managed RC Kouba in the Algerian Ligue Professionnelle 2.

He has made a resume by promoting teams from inferior leaguers, and players, in Romania, before he decided to go to Africa and coach there, in 1999. He trained teams in Algeria, Tunisia, Burkina Faso and Niger.

He was manager of the Niger national football team between June and December 2008.

He led JSM Chéraga for the first time to the semifinals of the 2013–14 Algerian Cup.

References

External links

Dan Anghelescu at Gazeta Sporturilor 

1958 births
Living people
Romanian football managers
ASC Daco-Getica București managers
US Chaouia managers
Jendouba Sport managers
AS Aïn M'lila managers
USM Blida managers
USM El Harrach managers
NA Hussein Dey managers
Niger national football team managers
MO Constantine managers
RC Kouba managers
Romanian expatriate football managers
Expatriate football managers in Algeria
Expatriate football managers in Niger
Expatriate football managers in Tunisia
Expatriate football managers in Morocco
Expatriate football managers in Burkina Faso
Romanian expatriate sportspeople in Algeria
Romanian expatriate sportspeople in Morocco
Romanian expatriate sportspeople in Tunisia
Romanian expatriate sportspeople in Burkina Faso